The Escanaba Public Library was a Carnegie library located at 201 South Seventh Street in Escanaba, Michigan. It was listed on the National Register of Historic Places in 1977 and designated a Michigan State Historic Site in 1976.

History
The Escanaba Public Library was constructed with $20,000 in funds donated by Andrew Carnegie.  The city of Escanaba promised additional yearly operation funds. The building was designed by local architect Theodore Lohff.  The Carnegie library opened in May 1903.

In 1992, the city began construction on a new city hall and library complex.  The library moved to the new location in 1995, and the old Carnegie building was sold to private owners, who refurbished it with the intention of converting it into a private home.

Description

The Escanaba Public Library is a one-story Classical Revival building constructed of red brick and Lake Superior Sandstone.  It sits on a rough-faced stone foundation.  The front facade has a portico entrance with an entablature and pediment supported by four Ionic columns.  Windows flanked by pilasters and topped with lintels lighten the mass of the building.  The building is topped with a cornice and pediments on each side; a balustrade which originally ran between the pediments was removed in 1928. A low dome originally topped building; it was removed in 1958. An upper dome still is in place.  The rear of the building is of simpler design, constructed of brick and containing simple windows with stone sills.

References

Libraries on the National Register of Historic Places in Michigan
Neoclassical architecture in Michigan
Government buildings completed in 1902
Buildings and structures in Delta County, Michigan
Michigan State Historic Sites
Carnegie libraries in Michigan
National Register of Historic Places in Delta County, Michigan
1902 establishments in Michigan